Bahrami (Persian: یمارهب) is a Persian-origin surname. The word is a derivative of the male given name Bahram.

Notable people with the surname include:

 Aidin Nikkhah Bahrami (1982–2007), Iranian basketball player
 Ameneh Bahrami (born 1978), Iranian acid attack victim
 Hossein Bahrami (born 1995), Iranian football player
 Mahdi Bahrami (born 1994), Iranian computer programmer
 Mansour Bahrami (born 1956), Iranian tennis player
 Mohammad Bahrami (1898–1957), Iranian politician
 Mohammad Amin Bahrami (born 1997), Iranian football player
 Samad Nikkhah Bahrami (born 1983), Iranian basketball player 
 Sara Bahrami (born 1983), Iranian actress
 Zahra Bahrami (1965–2011), Iranian political prisoner

See also
 Bahrami (disambiguation)

References

Persian-language surnames
Surnames from given names